Euphorbia hirsuta is a species of herb in the family Euphorbiaceae.

Sources

References 

hirsuta
Flora of Malta